Preus Museum is the national museum for photography located in Horten, Norway. 

Preus Museum was founded in 1976 by Leif Preus and the members of the Preus family as a private museum. The collection was acquired by the Norwegian government in 1995. The museum's collection consists of  photos and various other forms of images, together with cameras and related equipment which illustrate  the history of photography. In 2001, the museum moved to the former naval facility at Karljohansvern in Vestfold og Telemark county. The facilities have been adapted for museum use based on the work of architect Sverre Fehn.

See also
 Morten Qvale, Norwegian fashion photographer

References

External links 
 Preus Museum
Preus museum (Flickr, a Yahoo company) 

Photography museums and galleries in Norway
Museums in Vestfold og Telemark
Photography archives in Norway